Userway is a digital accessibility company based in Wilmington, Delaware. The company uses A.I. and automation in response to legal pressure on companies to make their websites accessible. It is being traded on the Tel Aviv Stock Exchange.

History 
Userway was founded in 2016 by Allon Mason. In 2021, Susan Bennett, the original voice of Apple’s Siri personal assistant, became the company spokesperson and disability advocate for Userway`s promotional campaign which also starred Dr. Orna Guralnik. In December 2021, the company submitted a first draft prospectus for its IPO on the Tel Aviv Stock Exchange.

In January 2022, the company issued its IPO on the Tel Aviv Stock Exchange at a value of 120 million NIS. It went on to raise approximately 30 million NIS from institutional clients. Userway began trading on the Tel Aviv Stock Exchange under the name UWAY.

Userway's Accessibility Widget is available for all major CMS platforms as well as plain HTML/CSS/JS sites. Userway’s technology meets compliance laws based on WCAG 2.1 AA standards and as required by the ADA.

References
 
Companies based in Delaware
Companies based in Wilmington, Delaware
Assistive technology